Gaoussou Fofana (born April 17, 1984 in Feseguela, Abidjan, Ivory Coast) is an Ivorian professional footballer who plays for APEP as a winger.

Early life
Fofana was born in Feseguela, a small part of Abidjan. He is best friends with Christodoulos Liotatis from Paralimni.

Club career
Fofana began his professional football career at the age of 22 when he signed for Santa Clara. In the 2007-08 season, Fofana was transferred to Académica de Coimbra and he played 8 matches with 1 goal. The next season, Fofana moved back to Santa Clara from the Portuguese Liga side Académica de Coimbra on loan. At the end of the season, Fofana scored 1 goal in 22 matches and was transferred to Sporting Covilhã and he stayed there for two seasons, scoring 4 goals in 56 matches. In July 2012, he signed a contract with Doxa. and he made a step above with the transfer to Anorthosis Famagusta in July 2013.

Anorthosis Famagusta

On 3 July 2013, Anorthosis signed a year loan contract with Fofana, with wages more than double the wages he was getting on Doxa. Anorthosis fans liked Fofana for his passion on every moment he is spending to the pitch.

Personal life
On 8 July 2014, his 7-year-old son died of malaria in the Makarios hospital in Nicosia.

References

1984 births
Living people
Ivorian footballers
Ivorian expatriate footballers
Primeira Liga players
Cypriot First Division players
Cypriot Second Division players
Associação Académica de Coimbra – O.A.F. players
C.D. Santa Clara players
S.C. Covilhã players
Doxa Katokopias FC players
Anorthosis Famagusta F.C. players
AC Omonia players
Ermis Aradippou FC players
Othellos Athienou F.C. players
APEP FC players
Expatriate footballers in Portugal
Expatriate footballers in Cyprus
Footballers from Abidjan
Association football wingers